Monklands East was a constituency represented in the House of Commons of the Parliament of the United Kingdom from 1983 until 1997. It elected one Member of Parliament (MP) by the first past the post voting system. For the 1997 general election, it was replaced in part by Airdrie and Shotts.

It was previously held by the former Leader of the Opposition John Smith.

Boundaries
The Monklands District electoral divisions of Airdrie East, Airdrie South and West, and Chapelhall and Salsburgh.

The constituency included the town of Airdrie and a substantial part of eastern Coatbridge (Carnbroe, Shawhead, Whifflet, Greenend, Sikeside, Coatdyke, Cliftonville) together with villages such as Chapelhall, Calderbank, Plains, Caldercruix, and Greengairs.

Members of Parliament

Election results

Elections of the 1980s

Elections of the 1990s

References 

Historic parliamentary constituencies in Scotland (Westminster)
Constituencies of the Parliament of the United Kingdom established in 1983
Constituencies of the Parliament of the United Kingdom disestablished in 1997
Politics of North Lanarkshire
Airdrie, North Lanarkshire